Anibal José (29 March 1904 – 8 January 1976) was a Portuguese footballer who played for Benfica, Vitória Setúbal and the Portugal national team, as midfielder.

International career 
José made his debut for the national team 1 December 1929 against Italy in a heavy 1-6 defeat in Milan. He totally gained 4 caps and was a non-playing member of Portugal's 1928 Olympic Squad.

References

External links 
 
 
 

1904 births
1976 deaths
S.L. Benfica footballers
Vitória F.C. players
Portugal international footballers
Portuguese footballers
Primeira Liga players
Olympic footballers of Portugal
Footballers at the 1928 Summer Olympics
Association football midfielders